Rufus Phineas Stebbins (3 March 1810 in South Wilbraham, Massachusetts – 13 August 1885 in Cambridge, Massachusetts) was a Massachusetts and Pennsylvania clergyman.

Biography
After graduating from Amherst College in the class of 1834, he studied theology at the Harvard Divinity School. He was ordained as pastor of a Unitarian church at Leominster, Massachusetts, 20 September 1837, where he remained until 1844. He held a pastorate at Meadville, Pennsylvania from 1844–1849, and was president of the theological seminary there from 1844–1856. He then held various pastorates, and at the First Unitarian Church of Newton, Massachusetts, from 1877 until his death. Harvard University gave him the degree of D.D.

Works
He was the author of a history of Wilbraham, Massachusetts (Boston, 1864), Study of the Pentateuch (1881), Common-Sense View of the Books of the Old Testament (1885) and numerous addresses.

References

External links
 

1810 births
1885 deaths
American clergy
Harvard Divinity School alumni
Amherst College alumni
People from Wilbraham, Massachusetts
19th-century American clergy